The Battle of Ahualulco took place on 29 September 1858 during the War of Reform, near the town of Ahualulco in the state of San Luis Potosí, Mexico, between elements of the liberal army, commanded by the Generals Santiago Vidaurri, Juan Zuazua and Francisco Naranjo and conservative army troops commanded by General Miguel Miramón and Leonardo Márquez. 
Vidaurri's army was defeated and the conservatives won the battle as the result. The liberals suffered 672 casualties and 91 prisoners. It is considered by some to be one of the most brilliant triumphs of Miramón.

References

Sourcing 

 
 

1858 in Mexico
Conflicts in 1858
September 1858 events
Reform War